DVD+R DS (DS stands for Double Side) a sub category of DVD+R. It can only be written once. (DVD+RW can be written, erased and rewritten)

See also 
 DVD
 DVD+R
 DVD-R
 DVD+RW
 MultiLevel Recording
 List of optical disc manufacturers

References

External links
 Official white papers
 What is the Difference between D5/D9/D10/D18/DVD+R/DVD+RW and other DVD discs?

DVD